The Aberdeen International Curling Championship is an annual bonspiel, or curling tournament, that takes place at the Curl Aberdeen in Aberdeen, Scotland. The tournament is a Triple Knockout format. The tournament was started in 2016 as part of the World Curling Tour.

Past champions
''Only skip's name is displayed.

References

http://aberdeeninternationalcurling.blogspot.ca/

World Curling Tour events
Curling competitions in Scotland
Sports competitions in Aberdeen
Champions Curling Tour events